Beinan may refer to these topics in Taiwan:

Beinan, Taitung, a township in Taitung County
Puyuma people, an aboriginal people in Taitung County, also known as Beinan people
Beinan River, a small river in Taitung County

See also
Beinan Cultural Park, an archaeological site in Beinan Township